Adrian Chiles (born 21 March 1967) is a British writer and television and radio presenter. He has co-presented both The One Show (2007–2010) and Daybreak (2010–2011) with Christine Lampard. He was also the chief presenter for football coverage on ITV Sport from 2010 until 2015. His journalistic training and love of football resulted in his presenting business programmes such as Working Lunch and The Money Programme as well as sports programmes like Match of the Day 2. He currently works for BBC Radio 5 Live.

Early life and career
Chiles was born in Quinton, Birmingham, to an English father and Croatian mother, and moved a few miles away to Hagley, Worcestershire at the age of four. His Birmingham accent is a feature of his presentations. He also speaks Croatian, despite having a self-confessed imperfect understanding of the language's verbs, declensions, and cases. Chiles started his education at Haybridge High School, and then worked in his father's scaffolding business, before graduating with a degree in English literature from the University of London (studying at Westfield College, now part of Queen Mary, University of London).

Before going to university he was a keen amateur actor, appearing in the Crescent Theatre's musical production of Mary O'Malley's Once A Catholic and Sandy Wilson's The Cheese. After university, while waiting for his broken leg to heal from an amateur football incident, he applied for and failed both Civil Service exams, before being asked to apply for MI5 — he failed the second interview. He studied journalism at Cardiff and then worked as a sports reporter for the News of the World.

Television

BBC
Chiles joined the BBC, originally for work experience on Business Breakfast.

Chiles' experience from Financial World Tonight led to him fronting the BBC Two business show Working Lunch, where he came to popular notice.

He has since created, scripted and fronted a variety of other programmes for the BBC including, for BBC Two, the 2003 series So What Do You Do All Day? – a look at the lives of the rich and famous – and Asian Millionaires. For BBC One he created and fronted Royal Millions, an investigation of the Queen's finances, as well as reports for Panorama and various documentaries.

From 2006 until 2009, Chiles presented the spin-off series of the popular UK television show The Apprentice called The Apprentice: You're Fired! in which he interviews the latest candidate to be fired. He left the BBC in 2009, and was replaced by Dara Ó Briain.

During August 2006 Chiles co-presented a pilot of a new BBC One early-evening magazine programme, The One Show. The programme was re-commissioned for 2007 with Chiles returning as host, leaving Working Lunch. Chiles' last appearance on The One Show was on 30 April 2010 and his favourite guest from the programme, rock singer Robert Plant, appeared again. His final show also saw video tributes to an emotional Chiles from Prime Minister Gordon Brown and political leaders David Cameron and Nick Clegg.

In April 2007, Chiles was a guest host of BBC One's satirical news quiz, Have I Got News for You.

In January 2016, Chiles returned to BBC television, where he fronted a 2-part religion/travel series My Mediterranean with Adrian Chiles for BBC Two. In July 2016, he presented a special edition of Panorama called "Why We Voted to Leave: Britain Speaks" for BBC One. On 1 January 2019, he hosted a follow-up programme on BBC Radio 4 called "Brexit: bewitched, bothered or bewildered?" in which he spoke again to the same people – more than two years on – on how they now felt about Brexit. In November 2016, he fronted one-off documentary Whites v Blacks: How Football Changed a Nation for BBC Two.

Chiles co-presented Christine and Adrian's Friendship Test, a three-part documentary series with Christine Lampard. The series was broadcast on BBC Northern Ireland in November 2017.

In August 2018, Chiles presented a BBC Two documentary entitled Drinkers Like Me in which he admitted to regularly drinking in excess of 100 units of alcohol per week and investigated why alcohol had become such a big part of his life. As part of the programme, a doctor carried out a Fibroscan liver test on him, which produced a score of 8.9, indicating mild/moderate fibrosis of the liver and significant hepatic steatosis.

BBC Sport
When the BBC won back the rights to Premier League football, Chiles became the host of Match of the Day 2 on Sundays. In the run-up to the 2006 World Cup, he was an integral part of BBC Three's African Cup of Nations coverage. He was also a member of the BBC's World Cup team, often bringing viewers late night highlights. He was a main presenter of the BBC's Euro 2008 coverage and was one of the anchors of the morning 2008 Olympics coverage from Beijing.

ITV
After news media speculation suggesting that the BBC wished to increase the popularity of The One Show on Fridays by introducing Chris Evans alongside Christine Lampard in an extended one-hour format, Chiles was said to be discussing a contract with ITV. After Evans was confirmed as the new Friday presenter in a revamped one-hour format, Chiles left the BBC for ITV in a four-year contract, speculated to be worth £1 million per year. Chiles left the BBC on 30 April 2010.

From May 2010, Chiles fronted ITV's football coverage. He made his ITV debut on 24 May 2010, presenting the England v Mexico friendly at Wembley (England won the match 3–1).

On 6 September 2010, he made his first appearance on Daybreak, ITV's new breakfast television programme. The show failed to capture a larger market share than its competitor Breakfast, and on 18 November 2011 it was announced that Chiles would be axed from the show. He was replaced by Dan Lobb.

In January 2011, Chiles began presenting That Sunday Night Show on ITV, which returned for a second series in September 2011 and a third in January 2012.

His contract with ITV came to an end on 20 April 2014. However, he signed a new contract to purely host ITV's football coverage. The new contract included a wage cut of £1 million per year.

On 23 January 2015, it was announced that Chiles had left his role as ITV's football host with immediate effect. He has not returned to the channel since.

Radio
In his early career at the BBC, Chiles became an assistant producer and, by 1993, was presenting Radio 4's Financial World Tonight.

He began presenting and producing his own show Chiles on Saturday for Radio 5 Live, which was awarded the sports category Gold Medal at the Sony Radio Academy Awards in 2002.

In November 2013, Chiles returned to Radio 5 Live, co-presenting Drive on Fridays with Anna Foster.

In October 2014, he became the Monday and Tuesday host of new programme 5 Live Daily from 10am to 1pm; with Peter Allen, and subsequently Emma Barnett, hosting Wednesday to Friday.

In January 2018, he was moved to Fridays only and the title was changed to Chiles on Friday, with Emma Barnett hosting from Monday to Thursday under the title The Emma Barnett Show, although the content remains essentially the same.

Other activities
Chiles was the World Record holder for highest number of kisses received in 60 seconds from 2007 until 2009, with 78.

In 2004, Chiles appeared with Johnny Vegas and Mackenzie Crook in the film Sex Lives of the Potato Men in a cameo role as the host of a sex party.

He appeared on the second series of Al Murray's Happy Hour as himself, and also had a cameo as himself in Series Two of That Mitchell and Webb Look.

On 23 November 2009, Chiles released a 2 Good 2 Bad: The World Cup DVD based on the popular segment from Match of the Day 2.

An extra episode,  ('Language Road Trip: Christmas') was broadcast at the end of 2020, interviewing each of the celebrities about whether they were still making use of their Welsh and the opportunities they had had to use Welsh during lockdown.

Chiles wrote the non-fiction book The Good Drinker: How I Learned to Love Drinking Less, published in October 2022.

Personal life
Chiles married Jane Garvey, a former regular presenter of Woman's Hour on Radio 4, in September 1998 in Swansea. Chiles and Garvey have two daughters. In June 2008, the couple separated; they divorced in October 2009. Chiles married Guardian editor Kath Viner in 2022.

Chiles converted to Catholicism in 2007. During Lent 2015, he attended Mass daily and at a different church each time; a total of 46 different churches in 46 days.

He is a supporter of West Bromwich Albion Football Club, where he is a season-ticket holder and presenter on some of the club's official DVDs. Both of his cars have WBA in their registration and he has a stained glass West Bromwich Albion crest above his door.

Chiles plays the double bass, as revealed when he dueted with violinist Nigel Kennedy playing "Fever" on The One Show. On 7 May 2008, his co-presenter on The One Show, Christine Lampard, sang part of a song with Chiles accompanying on piano.

Chiles claims that his "Brummie" accent worked in his favour at the BBC.

Chiles began writing a regular column for The Guardian in February 2019. He confirmed his relationship with the newspaper's editor, Katharine Viner, in an interview with The Daily Telegraph in April 2020, saying "I’ve got a horror of talking about relationships. I don’t mind saying I’m with Kath." Chiles has said that the relationship began as a result of him writing the column and not the other way around.

In 2019, Chiles wrote an opinion piece detailing his experience after several publications such as the Mail on Sunday republished false information about his alleged marriage to a woman named Maria Walsh in his Wikipedia article, presumably from erroneous information within a Daily Mail article. The Daily Mail article has since been corrected.

In 2020, Chiles revealed in his Guardian column that he had been diagnosed with ADD. He wrote that his condition is being successfully treated with prescription drugs, after he had initially disregarded his symptoms.

Chiles describes himself as "almost vegan". He has a urinal in his flat and has written about the mixed reactions it receives.

Charity work
In March 2008, Chiles embarked on a charity cycling trip with footballer Alan Shearer from Newcastle upon Tyne to London via West Bromwich for Sport Relief. The duo raised £371,065 for their feat.

In 2010, Chiles grew a beard, which was later shaved off by his One Show co-host Christine Lampard for Sport Relief, raising £60,000 in the process.

Publications
The stories of a varied cast of avid West Bromwich Albion supporters whom Chiles met over the course of the 2005–06 season, at the end of which the team was relegated from the Premier League. The book also documents Chiles' own obsession with his beloved "Baggies".

Filmography
Television

References

Sources
 Celebrity guests gallery BBC – The One Show
Celebrity Fan Adrian Chiles Talks Everything West Brom Exclusively to TF90M TF90M – The First 90 Minutes
 Adrian Chiles profile BBC Sport Match of the Day, 11 August 2004

External links
 Adrian Chiles (BBC Radio 5 Live)
 Chiles on Friday (BBC Radio 5 Live)
 

1967 births
Living people
Alumni of Cardiff University
Alumni of Westfield College
BBC Radio 5 Live presenters
BBC sports presenters and reporters
British Roman Catholics
British male journalists
English people of Croatian descent
British radio personalities
British sports broadcasters
British television presenters
Converts to Roman Catholicism
ITV Breakfast presenters and reporters
Mass media people from Worcestershire
People from Wyre Forest District